Rick Olson may refer to:

 Rick Olson (Iowa politician) (born 1951), Iowa state representative
 Rick Olson (Michigan politician) (born 1949), member of the Michigan House of Representatives